Larisa was a town of ancient Ionia. Strabo distinguishes it from other homonymous cities of Asia Minor, mentioning that the Larisa of Ionia was in the Cayster River plain, 180 stadia from Ephesus, where there was a sanctuary of Apollo Larisaeus.

Its site is unlocated.

References

Populated places in ancient Troad
Former populated places in Turkey
Lost ancient cities and towns